Perry Martter (February 19, 1901 – June 13, 1954) was an American wrestler. He competed in the freestyle lightweight event at the 1924 Summer Olympics.

References

1901 births
1954 deaths
Olympic wrestlers of the United States
Wrestlers at the 1924 Summer Olympics
American male sport wrestlers
People from Coshocton, Ohio
Sportspeople from Ohio